Robert S. Farrell High School was a public high school in Salem, Oregon, United States. It was part of the Hillcrest Youth Correctional Facility before the facility closed in 2017.

References

High schools in Salem, Oregon
Boarding schools in Oregon
Public high schools in Oregon